Glenn Johnson may refer to:

 Glenn Johnson (American football) (1922–2001), American football player who played for the Green Bay Packers in 1949
 Glenn Johnson (footballer, born 1952), English footballer for Aldershot, Doncaster Rovers and Walsall
 Glenn Johnson (drummer), rock drummer and composer
 Glenn Johnson (coach), American football, basketball and baseball player and coach

See also
 Glen Johnson (disambiguation)